This is a list of members of the Tasmanian House of Assembly between the 22 April 1972 election and the 11 December 1976 election.

Notes
  Labor MHA for Denison, Merv Everett, resigned on 12 April 1974 to contest an Australian Senate seat at the 1974 federal election. Ian Cole was elected as his replacement at a recount on 27 April 1974.
  Labor MHA for Wilmot, Roy Fagan, retired on 15 July 1974. Charles Batt was elected as his replacement at a recount on 29 July 1974.
  Labor MHA for Bass, Dr Allan Foster, resigned on 15 July 1974 after a car accident. Harry Holgate was elected as his replacement at a recount on 29 July 1974.
  Labor MHA for Denison, Kevin Corby, resigned on 5 August 1974. John Green was elected as his replacement at a recount on 19 August 1974.
  Labor MHA for Braddon, Eric Reece, resigned on 31 March 1975 after the Labor Party set the retiring age of MPs at 65 (he was 65 and 8 months at the time). Joseph Britton was elected as his replacement at a recount on 12 April 1975.
  Labor MHA for Braddon, Lloyd Costello, resigned in April 1975. John Coughlan was elected as his replacement at a recount on 16 May 1975.
  Liberal MHA for Wilmot, Angus Bethune, resigned on 30 June 1975. Ian Braid was elected as his replacement at a recount on 14 July 1975.

Sources
 Parliament of Tasmania (2006). The Parliament of Tasmania from 1856

Members of Tasmanian parliaments by term
20th-century Australian politicians